SS-103 or SS 103 may refer to:

 SS Heavy Panzer Battalion 103, a unit of the German Army 
 USS R-26 (SS-103), a United States Navy submarine which saw service during World War I